Pavel Lipilin (born 11 July 1999) is a Kazakhstani water polo player. He competed in the 2020 Summer Olympics.

References

1999 births
Living people
People from Oral, Kazakhstan
Sportspeople from Almaty
Water polo players at the 2020 Summer Olympics
Kazakhstani male water polo players
Olympic water polo players of Kazakhstan
Water polo goalkeepers
Asian Games gold medalists for Kazakhstan
Asian Games medalists in water polo
Water polo players at the 2018 Asian Games
Medalists at the 2018 Asian Games
21st-century Kazakhstani people